Pressparty is a London and New York-based press release hosting platform used by the music and entertainment industry globally. Registered users have the ability to upload and read content but unregistered users can only read it. Users are able to access Pressparty through the website's interface, or via mobile.

Artist profiles feature a news desk and industry and company profiles feature a press release desk.

Overview
Pressparty publishes official press releases from broadcasting networks, and about well-known names in pop music and entertainment, including: Demi Lovato, J. Cole, DJ Drama, Mustard, 2 Chainz, DaBaby, Lily Allen, Mabel, Jessie Reyez, Lorde, Greta Thunberg, Halsey, BTS, Blackpink, Eminem, Missy Elliott, Little Simz, City Girls, SuperM, Tyga, Blink-182, Ty Dolla Sign, Tee Grizzley, Nicki Minaj, James Blake, Benee, Jax Jones, Rihanna, Lady Gaga, Justin Bieber, One Direction, Adam Lambert, Rebecca Ferguson, Bruno Mars, Kelly Osbourne, Drake, Adele and Elton John., The Vamps, Gavin DeGraw, Heffron Drive, Jahméne, Mike Posner, Skunk Anansie, Tom Parker, Janet Devlin.

The platform also features interviews given exclusively to Pressparty by such names as Nick Jonas, Carly Rae Jepsen, Fifth Harmony, The Vamps, The Hoosiers, Rebecca Ferguson, Jessica Lowndes, Mike Posner, The Script, Lemar, Taylor Momsen, best-selling songwriter Savan Kotecha, Grammy-nominated singer Adam Lambert, Janet Devlin, The Janoskians, Skunk Anansie, Jessica Lowndes, Nothing But Thieves, Counterfeit, Lower Than Atlantis, Lights, Mr Probz, Shayne Ward, Sheppard, Sleeping With Sirens, Jedward, Austin Mahone, The Janoskians, Collabro, Katie Melua, Alexis Jordan, Sharon Corr, Matt Cardle, Nina Nesbitt, Sharon Corr, DJ Fresh, The Struts, Pixie Lott, Gavin DeGraw, Heffron Drive, Mike Posner, Prides, Nina Nesbitt, Lemar, The Darkness, Samantha Faiers, Grizfolk, Collabro, Hunter Hayes, The Darkness, Jahméne, Tom Parker, and Ella Henderson.

References

External links
Pressparty Website

Companies based in the City of London
Public relations companies of the United Kingdom
Online companies of the United Kingdom